Measurement is a peer-reviewed scientific journal covering all aspects of metrology. It was established in 1983 and is published 18 times per year. It is published by Elsevier on behalf of the International Measurement Confederation and the editor-in-chief is Paolo Carbone (University of Perugia). According to the Journal Citation Reports, the journal has a 2021 impact factor of 5.131.

References

External links

Metrology
Elsevier academic journals
Publications established in 1983
Journals published between 13 and 25 times per year
Statistics journals
English-language journals
Physics journals